Paul Lynton Bagshaw  (born 22 August 1946) is a former Australian rules footballer who represented  in the South Australian National Football League (SANFL) during the 1960s and 1970s. Bagshaw played 360 games for the Double Blues and 14 for South Australia. He also kicked 258 goals for Sturt and captained the club from 1973 to 1980.  He played in seven winning grand finals.

Throughout his playing career, Bagshaw played mostly as ruck-rover, but also was an effective key position player. He was one of the last players to use the drop kick frequently, and displayed outstanding handball and marking skills. His ability to achieve the seemingly impossible in tight situations gave rise to the nickname "Mr. Magic".  In 1979 Bagshaw was made a Member of the Order of the British Empire  for his services to football. He was inducted into the SANFL Hall of Fame in 2002, and into the Australian Football Hall of Fame in 2016.

Bagshaw's father was 1940 Sturt premiership ruckman Hartley Bagshaw, while his younger brothers Bill and John and son Guy also played for Sturt.

References

Bibliography

External links

Australian rules footballers from South Australia
Sturt Football Club players
South Australian Football Hall of Fame inductees
Living people
1946 births
Southern Football League (South Australia) players
Australian Football Hall of Fame inductees
Australian Members of the Order of the British Empire